Copernicia curtissii is a palm which is endemic to Cuba.

References

curtissii
Trees of Cuba
Taxa named by Odoardo Beccari